Shaoguan (Hakka: Seukoan) is a prefecture-level city in northern Guangdong Province (Yuebei), South China, bordering Hunan to the northwest and Jiangxi to the northeast. It is home to the mummified remains of the sixth Zen Buddhist patriarch Huineng. Its built-up (or metro) area made up of Zhenjiang, Wujiang and Qujiang urban conurbated districts was home to 1,028,460 inhabitants as of the 2020 census.

History
Shaozhou was a prefecture under the Tang and Song.

In 1589, Matteo Ricci relocated his mission housethe first ever Jesuit mission in mainland Chinato Shaoguan after a fallout with the authorities in Zhaoqing. He remained in Shaoguan  for a few years, eventually benefiting from Shaoguan's location on the important north-south travel route to establish connections with traveling dignitaries that allowed him to move north, to Nanchang, Nanjing, and Beijing.

During World War II the city, then called Kukong, was the temporary capital of Guangdong Province.

In June 2009, Uyghurs and Han workers clashed at a toy factory in Shaoguan (Shaoguan incident), which was followed by the Ürümqi riots in July.

Geography

Shaoguan is the northernmost prefecture-level city of Guangdong, bordering Chenzhou (Hunan) to the northwest and north, Ganzhou (Jiangxi) to the northeast, Heyuan to the east, Guangzhou and Huizhou to the south, and Qingyuan to the west. It spans latitude 23° 05'−25° 31' N and longitude 112° 50'−114° 45' E. It is situated at the southern end of the Nan Mountains (Nan Ling), which primarily run east-west here, and is marked by numerous erosion-created valleys; within its borders lies the  Mount Shikeng, the highest point in the province. Shaoguan is also readily accessible by road as it is adjacent to the G4 Beijing–Hong Kong and Macau Expressway as well as numerous other National Highways.

At Shaoguan, the Wu River from the northwest and the Zhen River from the northeast join up to create the North River (Bei Jiang) which flows south to Guangzhou. The downtown part of Shaoguan is located on a peninsula between the Wu and Zhen Rivers. There are seven bridges crossing the three rivers.

Climate
Shaoguan has a monsoon-influenced humid subtropical climate (Köppen Cfa), with short, mild, damp winters, rainy springs, long, hot, and humid summers, and relatively sunny autumns. Due to the city's location far inland, winters are significantly cooler than in the rest of the province, with freezing rain possible in the nearby mountain passes in some years. Winter begins dry and relatively sunny but becomes progressively cloudier and damper. Spring is the cloudiest and wettest season, with the sun shining less than 30% of the time. With monthly percent possible sunshine ranging from 16% in March to 54% in July, the city receives 1,617 hours of bright sunshine annually.

Administrative divisions
Shaoguan has direct jurisdiction over 3 districts, 2 county-level cities and 5 counties:

Tourism
The Fengcai Tower in the centre of Shaoguan was built in the Ming Dynasty. To the south of the tower, at the other end of a pedestrian shopping street, the Dajian Monastery was founded in 660.

Near Shaoguan is the town of Maba, home of relics and museum of the Maba Man, Chinese Neanderthals. Near Maba is Nanhua Temple, which was founded by Huineng, the Sixth Patriarch of Zen Buddhism. Shaoguan Iron and Steel is also located near Maba.

Danxia Mountain is located in Renhua County, Shaoguan.

Northwest of Shaoguan, at the town of Pingshi, a stretch of river known as the Nine Torrents and Eighteen Shoals is a popular place for white-water rafting.

The city is served by Shaoguan Danxia Airport.

Education
Shaoguan University is located in the city.

Language
The main languages spoken are Hakka and Shaozhou Tuhua, related to Ping Chinese. Shaozhounese is spoken in Shaozhou city and Hakka (mainly Yetpet and Seunan dialects) are spoken in neighboring counties.

Notable people:

 Zhang, Jiu Ling(張九齡）)： a high ranking official of Tang Dynasty. (A.D. 618–A.D. 1127)
 Yu, Jing (余靖）)： a high ranking official of northern Song Dynasty. (A.D 960–A.D. 1127)
 Chu, Siu Hung(朱韶洪）)： Hong Kong social activist
 Regina Ho Yee Ting (何依婷）)： winner of 2017 Miss Hong Kong pageant, also an actress of Hong Kong

Gallery

See also
 Dajian Huineng
 Hanshan Deqing
 Roman Catholic Diocese of Shaozhou

Notes

References

External links

 http://www.shaoguan.gov.cn/ 
 https://web.archive.org/web/20040924085950/http://shaoguan.com.cn/ 
 Shaoguan, China

 
Prefecture-level divisions of Guangdong